Ranil Wickremesinghe, the 10th Prime Minister of Sri Lanka, was elected on 15 August 2015 as a result of the Sri Lankan general election, 2015. The following is a list of international prime ministerial trips made by Wickremesinghe since he assumed office. In addition, he was Sri Lankan's Prime minister from 1993 to 1994 and 2001 to 2004. The list does not include his trips in his 1st and 2nd term, that included United States meeting President George W. Bush in 2004, India and many others.

References

2015 in international relations
2016 in international relations
2017 in international relations
Ranil Wickremesinghe
Wickremesinghe, Ranil